Ultra Air S.A.S is a Colombian low-cost airline headquartered in Rionegro, Antioquia, Colombia, with its main base located at José María Córdova International Airport, serving Medellín.

History
Ultra Air was founded in 2020 by founder and former CEO of Viva Air Colombia & Viva Air Perú and former Interjet CEO William Shaw. It received its air operator's certificate from the Colombian Civil Aviation Authority in January 2022, and began passenger operations on February 23, 2022 with an inaugural flight from Bogotá to San Andrés Island. 

In January 2022, Ultra Air became the first airline to receive a mega-investment qualification from the Ministry of Commerce, Industry and Tourism, which grants tax incentives to companies that meet certain criteria such as creating a certain amount of new jobs (Ultra Air having created 22,000), and investing a certain amount (Ultra Air having planned to invest USD $30 million throughout the subsequent five years).

Destinations
As of January 2023, Ultra Air flies to the following destinations:

Fleet
As of January 2023, Ultra Air operates an all-Airbus A320 fleet.

See also
List of airlines of Colombia
List of low-cost carriers

References

Airlines of Colombia
Airlines established in 2020